The 2018 VFF National Super League is the 8th edition of the VFF National Super League, the highest tier football league in Vanuatu apart from Port Vila. The matches were played between 22 and 31 March 2018 at Luganville Soccer City Stadium.

Teams

Standings

Grand final
The 2018 VFF National Super League Grand Final was played between two teams:

Both teams had already qualified for the 2019 OFC Champions League by winning their respective competitions. The Grand Final decided the seeding of the two teams in the 2019 OFC Champions League, with the winner seeded as Vanuatu 1 and the runner-up seeded as Vanuatu 2.

See also
2017–18 Port Vila Premier League

References

VFF National Super League seasons
Vanuatu
2017–18 in Vanuatuan football